AhangarKela (Ahangarkala, Mazandarani: Angerkela; , also Romanized as Āhangar Kolā) is a village in Esbu Kola Rural District, in the Central District of Babol County, Mazandaran Province, Iran. At the 2006 census, its population was 227, in 53 families.

References 

Populated places in Babol County